The 2012 AFL season was the 116th season of the Australian Football League (AFL), the highest level senior Australian rules football competition in Australia, which was known as the Victorian Football League until 1989.

The season featured eighteen clubs, with addition of the newly established Greater Western Sydney Giants, which was based in Western Sydney and split its home games between Sydney and Canberra.

The season ran from 24 March until 29 September, and comprised a 22-game home-and-away season followed by a finals series featuring the top eight clubs.

The premiership was won by the Sydney Swans for the fifth time, after it defeated  by ten points in the 2012 AFL Grand Final.

Pre-season

Draft

The 2011 National Draft was held on 24 November in Sydney, making it only the second time it was held out of Melbourne.

NAB Cup

Adelaide won the 2012 pre-season competition following a 34-point win over the West Coast Eagles at AAMI Stadium. It was their second pre-season cup premiership.

Premiership season
The fixture for this season was officially announced on 28 October 2011. Some of the features of the fixture included:
 Each team played twenty-two matches over twenty-three rounds.
 Each team had one bye, located between rounds 11 and 13. This is similar in practice to the split round concept, which (prior to 2011) saw one of the mid-season rounds played over two weeks, giving each team one week off.
 Due to concern over one-sided matches featuring the two newest teams ( and ), their fixtures were adjusted so that they played each of the top five teams from 2011 only once.
 For the first time, each Victorian team travelled interstate at least five times, and each team travelled to Perth at least once.
 Blundstone Arena, Blacktown International Sportspark and Škoda Stadium hosted home and away matches for the first time in 2012.
 As had been the case since 2010, the final round of matches was given a floating fixture. Exact dates were determined later in the season with a view to giving likely finalists the longest possible break ahead of their first final.

The addition of a ninth match in each round, and the new television rights deal requiring most matches to be shown live, influenced the scheduling of matches, and changed some traditional match starting times. In typical rounds, where nine matches were played between Friday and Sunday, the changes were:
 Friday night matches began at 7:50 pm EST instead of 7:40 pm, or 8:40 pm EST when played in South Australia or Western Australia.
 Saturday afternoon matches began at 1:40 pm EST and 1:45 pm/2:10 pm EST.
 A regular Saturday match was scheduled beginning at 4:40 pm EST – which was either a twilight match on the east coast, or an afternoon match in Perth.
 Saturday night matches began at 7:40 pm EST instead of 7:10 pm.
 The second Sunday afternoon match began at 3:15 pm instead of the traditional 2:10 pm. This change was to allow the Seven Network to show the match live into Victoria, and use it as a lead-in to its struggling 6:00 pm news bulletin.

Rule changes
Following two high profile goal umpiring errors in the previous three years' grand finals, in which goals were awarded to Tom Hawkins (2009) and Sharrod Wellingham (2011) for shots which hit the post, video score reviews were introduced to AFL games for the first time. A score review could be initiated by the field umpire, at his own discretion or on request by the goal umpire, and television broadcast footage would be reviewed for visual evidence to overturn an on-field goal umpiring decision.

Round 1

Round 2

Round 3

Round 4

Round 5

Round 6

Round 7

Round 8

Round 9

Round 10

Round 11

Round 12

Round 13

Round 14

Round 15

Round 16

Round 17

Round 18

Round 19

Round 20

Round 21

Round 22

Round 23

Win/loss table

Bold – Home game
X – Bye
Opponent for round listed above margin

Ladder

Ladder progression

Finals series

Week one

Week two

Week three

Week four

Awards
On 11 November 2016, Watson relinquished the medal in the wake of the Essendon supplements saga.
The AFL Players Association awards were as follows:
The AFL Coaches Association Awards were as follows:

Coleman Medal

Numbers highlighted in blue indicates the player led the Coleman that round.
Underlined numbers indicates the player did not play that round.

Best and fairest

Player milestones

Club leadership

Club membership

Coach changes

References

External links
 AFL

Australian Football League seasons
 
2012 in Australian rules football